The 2011 Nielsen Pro Tennis Championship was a professional tennis tournament played on hard courts. It was the 20th edition of the tournament which was part of the 2011 ATP Challenger Tour. It took place in Winnetka, Illinois, between June 26 and July 3, 2011.

ATP entrants

Seeds

 1 Rankings are as of June 20, 2011.

Other entrants
The following players received wildcards into the singles main draw:
  James Blake
  Robby Ginepri
  Evan King
  Jack Sock

The following players received entry as a special exempt into the singles main draw:
  Pierre-Ludovic Duclos

The following players received entry from the qualifying draw:
  Luka Gregorc
  Bradley Klahn
  Denis Kudla
  Michael Shabaz

Champions

Singles

 James Blake def.  Bobby Reynolds, 6–3, 6–1

Doubles

 Treat Conrad Huey /  Bobby Reynolds def.  Jordan Kerr /  Travis Parrott, 7–6(9–7), 6–4

External links
Official Website
ITF Search 
ATP official site

Nielsen Pro Tennis Championship
Nielsen Pro Tennis Championship
Niel
Nielsen Pro Tennis Championship
Nielsen Pro Tennis Championship
Nielsen Pro Tennis Championship